Lenin (foaled 1937) was a South African bred Thoroughbred racehorse who was a Champion at two and three years of age in South Africa. He was purchased for 650 guineas by Maurice Lipschitz at the 1939 Rand Yearling Sales in Johannesburg. He raced from 1939 to 1943 in South Africa and won 18 of his 44 starts and ZAR32,422, an earnings record at the time. Among his wins were The South African Derby, Johannesburg Summer Handicap, Champion Stakes, Benoni Guineas and Natal Guineas. He won from 1000m to 3200m. He is regarded as the best racehorse to have run in South Africa in the first half of the 20th century.

Background 
South African horse racing at that time was dominated by handicaps and there were very few equal weight races outside of age group (two and three year old) races. As a result Lenin carried 133lbs or more in 33 of his 44 starts. Had he raced in the modern era with its many weight-for-age races it is almost certain he would have won many more races. Edmund Nelson wrote in 1966 in the South African Racehorse magazine that "the allocation of the big money should be on merit, not the whim of the handicapper. Our big handicaps are too rich in value, and they encourage false values in assessing the official statistics". Writing in 1982 renowned racecourse commentator Ernie Duffield wrote "The present record stake-earner Politician, would never have won the number of races he did win if he had raced in the old days, because we did not have the number of weight-for-age races and he would have been penalised correctly for every one of his wins".

Lenin was foaled at the famous Vogel Vlei Stud owned by the Birch Brothers. His birth "encapsulated the Birch philosophy of never mollycoddling horses. Lenin was actually born out in the veld during a snowstorm.” “Nobody could get to him for a whole week, but Drohsky suckled him and kept him alive all that time". "Lenin’s mother was an imported English mare called Drohsky, who is still revered among the Birches and ascribed “foundation mare” status. Drohsky’s family threw dozens of great racehorses, with her grand-daughter Maritime producing no less than two July winners, Sea Cottage and Naval Escort, and a July second, Top Gallant."

Lenin “remained the greatest hero of the (South African) turf for some 25 years until two great horses, Colorado King and Sea Cottage, began vying for the title” Lenin was retired to Lion Hill Stud in 1943 by his owner Maurice Lipschitz. Two of his daughters produced two decent stakes performers in Cuff Link (Johannesburg Summer Handicap, Gold Cup twice)  and Casbah (Johannesburg Spring Handicap, Johannesburg Summer Handicap)

Race Record

References 

1937 racehorse births
Racehorses bred in South Africa
Racehorses trained in South Africa
Thoroughbred family 5-h